Chester "Chet" Withey (8 November 1887, Park City, Utah – 6 October 1939, California) was an American silent film actor, director, and screenwriter. He participated in the production in total of some 100 films. 
  
Born in Park City, Utah, the son of Chester Henry Withey and Mary E. Kelso, Withey started his career in silent film as an actor in 1913. He starred in films such as the 1916 film The Wharf Rat.  He married Virginia Philley, a screenwriter, who also did some acting.

However, by 1916, he had already directed several films and decided to concentrate on work behind the camera. Withey was also accredited with writing for 15 films.

He retired from film directing in 1928 and died 6 October 1939.

Partial filmography

External links

 

1887 births
1939 deaths
American male silent film actors
People from Park City, Utah
Silent film directors
20th-century American male actors
Film directors from Utah
Silent film screenwriters
20th-century screenwriters